Albuminuria is a pathological condition wherein the protein albumin is abnormally present in the urine. It is a type of proteinuria. Albumin is a major plasma protein (normally circulating in the blood); in healthy people, only trace amounts of it are present in urine, whereas larger amounts occur in the urine of patients with kidney disease. For a number of reasons, clinical terminology is changing to focus on albuminuria more than proteinuria.

Signs and symptoms
It is usually asymptomatic but whitish foam may appear in urine. Swelling of the ankles, hands, belly or face may occur if losses of albumin are significant and produce low serum protein levels (nephrotic syndrome).

Causes
The kidneys normally do not filter large molecules into the urine, so albuminuria can be an indicator of damage to the kidneys or excessive salt intake. It can also occur in patients with long-standing diabetes, especially type 1 diabetes. Recent  international guidelines (KDIGO 2012) reclassified chronic kidney disease (CKD) based on cause, glomerular filtration rate category, and albuminuria category (A1, A2, A3).

Causes of albuminuria can be discriminated between by the amount of protein excreted.
 The nephrotic syndrome usually results in the excretion of about 3.0 to 3.5 grams per 24 hours.
 Nephritic syndrome results in far less albuminuria.
 Microalbuminuria (between 30 and 300 mg/24h, mg/L of urine or μg/mg of creatinine) can be a forerunner of diabetic nephropathy. The term albuminuria is now preferred in Nephrology since there is not a "small albumin" (microalbuminuria) or a "big albumin" (macroalbuminuria). A1 represents normal to mildly increased urinary albumin/creatinine ratio (<30 mg/g or < 3 mg/mmol); A2 represents moderately increased urinary albumin/creatinine ratio (30–300 mg/g or 3–30 mg/mmol, previously known as microalbuminuria); and A3 reflects severely increased urinary albumin/creatinine ratio >300 mg/g or > 30 mg/mmol).

Diagnosis
The amount of protein being lost in the urine can be quantified by collecting the urine for 24 hours, measuring a sample of the pooled urine, and extrapolating to the volume collected.

Also a urine dipstick test for proteinuria can give a rough estimate of albuminuria. This is because albumin is by far the dominant plasma protein, and bromophenol blue the agent used in the dipstick is specific to albumin.

Treatment 
Though there is some evidence that dietary interventions (to lower red meat intake) can be helpful in lowering albuminuria levels, there is currently no evidence that low protein interventions correlate to improvement in kidney function. Among other measures, blood pressure control, especially with the use of inhibitors of the renin-angiotensin-system, is the most commonly used therapy to control albuminuria.

References

External links

Abnormal clinical and laboratory findings for urine